Camelo Tacusalme (born 5 August 1989) is a Filipino footballer who plays for Kaya–Iloilo in the Philippines Football League.

Career
Tacusalme played for the West Negros University football team. In the United Football League, he played for Pachanga until its merger with Diliman to become Pachanga Diliman. Tacusalme then moved to Ceres–La Salle and later to JP Voltes. When the UFL was dissolved he remained with the club which joined the inaugural season in the Philippines Football League under the a new name, JPV Marikina.

After the 2017 season he joined Kaya–Iloilo in January 2018. He debuted for the club in a pre-season friendly against Sabah FA on January 25, 2018.

International
Tacusalme also played with the Philippines national football team in a friendly match against China in Guanzhou. He played in the centerback position. His team saw a 1–8 defeat in that match.

References

1989 births
Living people
Ceres–Negros F.C. players
JPV Marikina F.C. players
Kaya F.C. players
Filipino footballers
Philippines international footballers
Association football defenders
Footballers from Negros Occidental